|}

This is a list of electoral district results of the 1996 Western Australian election.

Results by Electoral district

Albany

Alfred Cove

Armadale

Avon

Ballajura

Bassendean

Belmont

Bunbury

Burrup

Carine

Churchlands

Cockburn

Collie

Cottesloe

Darling Range

Dawesville

Eyre

Fremantle

Geraldton

Girrawheen

Greenough

Hillarys

Innaloo

Joondalup

Kalgoorlie

Kimberley

Kingsley

Mandurah

Maylands

Merredin

Midland

Mitchell

Moore

Murdoch

Murray-Wellington

Nedlands

Ningaloo

Nollamara

Peel

Perth

Pilbara

Riverton

Rockingham

Roe

Roleystone

South Perth

Southern River

Stirling

Swan Hills

Thornlie

Vasse

Victoria Park

Wagin

Wanneroo

Warren-Blackwood

Willagee 

}

Yokine

See also 

 Results of the Western Australian state election, 1996 (Legislative Council)
 1996 Western Australian state election
 Candidates of the Western Australian state election, 1996
 Members of the Western Australian Legislative Assembly, 1996–2001

References 

Results of Western Australian elections
1996 elections in Australia